Yrjö Väisälä (6 September 1891 – 21 July 1971) was a Finnish astronomer and physicist.

His main contributions were in the field of optics. He was also active in geodetics, astronomy and optical metrology. He had an affectionate nickname of Wizard of Tuorla (Observatory/Optics laboratory), and a book with the same title in Finnish describes his works. His discoveries include 128 minor planets and 3 comets.

His brothers were mathematician Kalle Väisälä (1893–1968) and meteorologist Vilho Väisälä (1889–1969). His daughter Marja Väisälä (1916–2011) was an astronomer and discoverer of minor planets.

Väisälä was a fervent supporter of Esperanto, presiding over the Internacia Scienca Asocio Esperantista ("International Association of Esperanto Scientists") in 1968.

Optician 

He developed several methods for measuring the quality of optical elements, as well as a lot of practical methods of manufacturing said elements. This allowed the construction of some of the earliest high-quality Schmidt cameras, in particular a "field-flattened" version known as Schmidt-Väisälä camera. Contemporary to Bernhard Schmidt's design, but unpublished was also Prof. Yrjö Väisälä's identical design which he had mentioned in lecture notes in 1924 with a footnote: "problematic spherical focal surface".

Once he saw Schmidt's publication, he promptly went ahead and "solved" the field flattening problem by placing a doubly convex lens slightly in front of the film holder – back in the 1930s, astronomical films were glass plates (also see photographic plates). The resulting system is known as the Schmidt-Väisälä camera or sometimes as the Väisälä camera. (This solution is not perfect, as images of different colour end up at slightly different places.) Prof. Väisälä made a small test unit of 7 mirrors in a mosaic on stiff background steel frame, however it proved to be impossible to stabilize as "just adjust and forget" structure, and next time anybody tried it, was with active controls on Multiple Mirror Telescope.

Geodesy 

In the 1920s and 1930s Finland was doing its first precision triangulation chain measurements, and to create long-distance vertices Prof. Väisälä proposed usage of flash-lights on  altitude balloons, or on some big fireworks rockets. The idea was to measure the exact position of the flash against background stars, and by precisely knowing one camera location, to derive an accurate location for another camera. This required better wide-field cameras than were available, and was discarded.

Later, Prof. Väisälä developed a method to multiply an optical length reference using white light interferometry to precisely determine lengths of baselines used in triangulation chains. Several such baselines were created in Finland for second high-precision triangulation campaign in 1950s and 1960s.

Later GPS made these methods largely obsolete. The Nummela Standard Baseline established by Väisälä is still maintained by the Finnish Geodetic Institute in Nummela for the calibration of other distance measurement instruments.

Prof. Väisälä also developed excellent tools to measure earth rotational axis position by building so called zenith telescopes, and in the 1960s Tuorla Observatory was in the top rank of North Pole position tracking measurements.

In the 1980s radioastronomy was able to replace earth rotation tracking by referring things against "non-moving background" of quasars.

For these Zenith Telescopes, Prof. Väisälä made also one of the first experiments at doing mirrors of liquid mercury. (Such mirror needs extremely smooth rotational speeds which were achieved in the late 1990s.)

Astronomer 

The big Schmidt-Väisälä telescope he built was used at the University of Turku for searching asteroids and comets. His research group discovered 7 comets and 807 asteroids.

For this rather massive photographic survey work, Prof. Väisälä developed also a protocol of taking two exposures on same plate some 2–3 hours apart and offsetting those images slightly. Any dot-pairs that differed from background were moving, and deserved follow-up photos. This method halved the film consumption compared to method of "blink comparing", where plates get single exposures, and are compared by rapidly showing first and second exposures to human operator. (Blink-comparing was used to find e.g. Pluto.)

Yrjö Väisälä is credited by the Minor Planet Center with the discovery of 128 asteroids (see below) during 1935–1944. He used to name them with the names of his personal friends that had birthdays. One of them was the professor Matti Herman Palomaa, after whom an asteroid 1548 Palomaa was named. For this reason the Palomar Mountain Observatory in California has never had an asteroid bearing its name – the rules for naming asteroids state that the names have to differ from each other with more than one letter.

Besides minor planets, he has also discovered 3 comets. The parabolic comet C/1944 H1 observed in 1944 and 1945, as well as the two short period comets, 40P/Väisälä, a Jupiter-family comet, and C/1942 EA, a Halley-type and near-Earth comet. Together with Liisi Oterma he co-discovered the Jupiter-family comet 139P/Väisälä–Oterma, which was first classified as asteroid and received the provisional designation "1939 TN".

Honors and awards 

The University of Turku Astronomy department is known as VISPA: Väisälä Institute for Space Physics and Astronomy in honour of its founder. The lunar crater Väisälä is named after him, and so are the minor planets 1573 Väisälä and 2804 Yrjö.

List of discovered minor planets

Gallery

Notes

References

External links 
 Turun Ursa, 

1891 births
1971 deaths
20th-century astronomers
Finnish astronomers
Discoverers of asteroids
Discoverers of comets

Finnish Esperantists
Finnish geodesists
Optical engineers
People associated with the University of Turku
People from Joensuu
Astronomy-optics society